Lorenz Schindelholz (born 23 July 1966) is a Swiss bobsledder who competed in the late 1980s and early 1990s. He won a bronze medal in the four-man event with his teammates Gustav Weder, Donat Acklin and Curdin Morell at the 1992 Winter Olympics in Albertville.

Schindelholz also won three medals in the four-man event at the FIBT World Championships with two golds (1989, 1990) and one silver (1991).

References
Bobsleigh four-man Olympic medalists for 1924, 1932-56, and since 1964
Bobsleigh two-man world championship medalists since 1931
Bobsleigh four-man world championship medalists since 1930
DatabaseOlympics.com profile

1966 births
Bobsledders at the 1992 Winter Olympics
Living people
Olympic bronze medalists for Switzerland
Olympic bobsledders of Switzerland
Swiss male bobsledders
Olympic medalists in bobsleigh
Medalists at the 1992 Winter Olympics